William McCloy (10 November 1886 – 10 November 1975) was an Australian cricketer. He played five first-class matches for Queensland and New South Wales between 1910/11 and 1918/19.

See also
 List of New South Wales representative cricketers

References

External links
 

1886 births
1975 deaths
Australian cricketers
New South Wales cricketers
Queensland cricketers
Cricketers from Sydney